CNBC occasionally serves as an outlet for NBC Sports programming. Mainly, this has occurred on weekends, especially the afternoon, and its coverage is purposefully limited away from any part of the American trading day on weekdays.

Consistent programming includes the Premier League and the Olympics.

History

AMA Supercross
In 2022, ten AMA Supercross Championship races will air on CNBC.

College football

In 2016 and 2017, CNBC aired The Game, the annual college football game between Harvard University and Yale University as part of NBC Sports' Ivy League television contract. In 2022, CNBC is scheduled to air the first ever HBCU New York City Football Classic between Howard University and Morehead State University.

Cycling

In 2015, CNBC aired portions of the 2015 UCI Road Cycling World Championships.

In 2020, CNBC aired Stage 14 and Stage 15 of the Tour de France.

In 2022, CNBC aired stage 8 of the Paris–Nice.

In 2022, CNBC will air portions of the Women’s Tour de France.

Formula 1
In 2016, CNBC aired the Russian Grand Prix.

Golf

In 2001, CNBC began a four-year deal to televise events from the Senior PGA Tour, either live or tape delayed, with early-round coverage broadcast on cable feeds of Pax. CNBC president Bill Bolster stated that the decision was meant to help reduce CNBC's reliance on paid programming on weekends. PGA Tour commissioner Tim Finchem also felt that golf and business audiences were "extremely compatible" with each other.

In 2019 and 2021, CNBC aired coverage of the final two days of the Amundi Evian Championship, as part of the LPGA Tour. It will do the same in 2022.

Horse racing
 

In 2012, CNBC aired the Toyota Blue Grass Stakes and the Arkansas Derby.

In 2021, CNBC aired portions of the Royal Ascot and Breeders’ Cup Challenge Series.

In 2022, CNBC aired the Grade 2 Fountain of Youth Stakes from Gulfstream and the Grade 2 San Felipe Stakes from Santa Anita, as part of the Road to the Kentucky Derby.

IMSA

IndyCar

In 2016 and 2017, CNBC aired IndyCar races from Mid-Ohio. In 2017, CNBC also aired the IndyCar race from Toronto.

Major League Baseball

Beginning with the 1997 World Series, NBC would utilize CNBC for their post-game analysis programming.

NASCAR

In 2016, CNBC broadcast several NASCAR races (as part of the NASCAR on NBC package) due to scheduling conflicts with other NBCUniversal channels during the 2016 Summer Olympics.

In 2021, CNBC aired the NASCAR Xfinity Series race from Watkins Glen.

In 2020, the 2020 YellaWood 500 was bumped to CNBC after the race ran long and it interfered with other programming

On August 28, 2022, due to a rain out the previous night, CNBC aired the 2022 Coke Zero Sugar 400 at 10AM ET. The race was originally intended to be shown on NBC in primetime.

National Basketball Association

During the NBA Finals, additional coverage would be immediately available on CNBC, in which the panelists provided an additional half-hour of in-depth game discussions, after the NBC broadcast network's coverage concluded.

National Hockey League

Beginning in the 2011–12 season, CNBC showed coverage of the National Hockey League's Stanley Cup playoffs, produced as part of the NHL on NBC package.

Olympics coverage

Beginning in 2000, CNBC has carried portions of NBC's coverage of the Olympic Games outside of business day hours. The frequent delegation of curling coverage to CNBC during the 2010 Winter Olympics helped the sport gain a cult following among the business community.

Generally, during weekdays CNBC airs coverage from 5-8PM ET, following business coverage. During weekends, CNBC carries much more extensive Olympic coverage.

Summer Olympics

2000 Summer Olympics
CNBC's 2000 Summer Olympics coverage focused heavily on boxing. Combined with MSNBC, the networks carried 176 original hours of Olympic programming.

2004 Summer Olympics
CNBC carried 111 hours of Olympic programming during the 2004 Summer Olympics. While CNBC continued its focus on Boxing on weekdays, during weekends CNBC also featured coverage of beach volleyball, soccer and taekwondo.

2008 Summer Olympics

CNBC carried 95.5 hours of Olympic coverage during the 2008 Summer Olympics. CNBC focused on Boxing during the prime time 5-8PM ET slot, but also carried softball, tennis, weightlifting, wrestling and badminton during the overnight hours.

2012 Summer Olympics

CNBC carried 73 hours of Olympic coverage during the 2012 Summer Olympics, focusing exclusively on boxing.

2016 Summer Olympics

CNBC carried 42 hours of Olympic coverage during the 2016 Summer Olympics. Coverage focused on basketball, volleyball, archery, cycling, rugby, water polo and wrestling.

2020 Summer Olympics

CNBC carried 124.5 hours of Olympic coverage during the 2020 Summer Olympics. Coverage focused on diving, beach volleyball, skateboarding, rowing, canoeing, archery, water polo and rugby.

Winter Olympics

2002 Winter Olympics
CNBC used the same format as the 2000 Summer Olympics for the 2002 Winter Olympics, however instead of focusing on Boxing, the network focused on Hockey. CNBC and MSNBC combined for 207 hours of programming.

2006 Winter Olympics
CNBC carried 61 hours of Olympic programming during the 2006 Winter Olympics. CNBC focused on curling during weekdays and hockey during weekends.

2010 Winter Olympics

CNBC carried 100.5 hours of Olympic coverage during the 2010 Winter Olympics. CNBC mainly focused on curling, but also carried coverage of Ice Hockey and biathlon.

2014 Winter Olympics

CNBC carried 36 hours of Olympic coverage during the 2014 Winter Olympics, focusing exclusively on curling.

2018 Winter Olympics

CNBC carried 46 hours of Olympic coverage during the 2018 Winter Olympics. Coverage focused on hockey and curling.

2022 Winter Olympics

CNBC carried 80 hours of Olympic coverage during the 2022 Winter Olympics. Coverage focused primarily on curling and ice hockey.

Premier Lacrosse League

Because of a NASCAR delay, the 2021 Premier Lacrosse League All-Star Game aired on CNBC.

Rugby
CNBC currently airs matches from Six Nations Championship Rugby, both live and on tape delay.

Soccer

CNBC has participated in NBC's Championship Sunday effort to broadcast all matches on the final day of the Premier League soccer season.

In the past, CNBC has served as an alternate home for Premier League coverage.

During the 2020-21 FA Women's Super League season, CNBC aired 10 matches.

References

 
CNBC